Group A of the 2021 Africa Cup of Nations took place from 9 to 17 January 2022. The group consisted of Burkina Faso, hosts Cameroon, Cape Verde and Ethiopia.

Cameroon and Burkina Faso as the top two teams, along with Cape Verde as one of the four best third-placed teams, advanced to the round of 16.

Teams

Notes

Standings

Matches

Cameroon vs Burkina Faso

Ethiopia vs Cape Verde

Cameroon vs Ethiopia

Cape Verde vs Burkina Faso

Cape Verde vs Cameroon

Burkina Faso vs Ethiopia

References

External links
 

2021 Africa Cup of Nations